Stanz bei Landeck is a municipality in the district of Landeck in the Austrian state of Tyrol located 1 km north of the city of Landeck. The village was first mentioned in documents in 1150 as „Stanuc“. The main source of income is plums which are processed into schnapps.

References

External links

Cities and towns in Landeck District